The 2017-18 Botswana First Division South was the 53rd season of the Botswana First Division South since its inception in 1966. It was played from August to May. Notwane were crowned champions.

Team summaries

Teams promoted from Botswana Division One
 Jwaneng Fighters
 Blue Stars
Teams relegated to Botswana Division One
 Letlapeng
 Lesirane City
Stadiums and locations

League table

References

Football in Botswana